José Miguel Conejo Torres (born in Madrid, 28 April 1980), better known by his artistic name Leiva, is a Spanish singer, musician and songwriter. Between 2001 and 2010 he led with Ruben Pozo the Spanish rock band Pereza, with which he recorded 6 albums. After the dissolution of the band, he started a solo career with 3 charting solo albums: Diciembre in 2012, Pólvora in 2014 and Monstruos in 2016.

Biography
Leiva was born and raised in the neighborhood of Alameda de Osuna, in the northeast suburbs of Madrid. His great love of football coupled with his strong resemblance to Leivinha, a Brazilian footballer who at the time played for Atlético de Madrid, earned him the nickname Leiva. He would later use it as his stage name.

In Pereza
His first musical activity was in 1994, as he became part of the Malahierba band in which he was a drummer. In 1998 he formed a trio band together with Rubén Pozo and drummer Tuli with the intention of making cover versions of Leño. Subsequently Malahierba would evolve and become the band Pereza. The band released its debut album in 2001, but without much success. From the second album, Algo para cantar in 2003, the formation became a duo of Leiva and Ruben. With Animales in 2005, they gained great fame and consolidated their position as one of the most important Spanish pop rock bands. Pereza had three more albums, Los amigos de los animales in 2006, Aproximaciones in 2007 and Aviones in 2009.

Solo career
The duo split in September 2011 with Leiva continuing as a solo singer, songwriter and musician.

The first solo album of Leiva was Diciembre (2012), that was self-produced and received positive reviews and awards such as the Rolling Stone Award for best album of the year and two Latin Grammy nominations.

In January 2014 Leiva came out with his second solo album, titled Pólvora, a co-production with the Spanish musician Carlos Raya and Joe Blaney as soundman.

Both albums have proven very successful with Leiva releasing three singles charting singles on the Spanish singles market, and charting in PROMUSICAE charts, namely "Eme", "Afuera en la ciudad" and "Terriblemente Cruel" the latter two making it to positions 6 and 5 respectively on the Spanish charts.
'Eme' is a song  which was dedicated to  Michelle Jenner after a tough breakup. The singer express the left of her girlfriend, his feelings and his thoughts, hoping  that she would come back.

In 2016 Leiva came out with "Monstruos". Is a record in which he explains the monsters the common social fears at bedtime.

Discography

Albums and DVDs with Pereza
2001: Pereza (the only album as a trio, Rubén, Leiva and Tuli).
2002: Algo para cantar (as a duo of Rubén and Leiva)
2003: Algo para encantar (DVD)
2004: Algo para cantar (Special edition).
2005: Animales ("Princesas" became a successful single from the album)
2005: Princesas (DVD)
2006: Los amigos de los animales (Album and DVD)
2006: Barcelona (Album and DVD)
2007: Aproximaciones
2009: Baires, libro (Album and DVD)
2009: Aviones (Album and DVD) (notably romantic songs like "Llévame al baile"
2010: 10 años

Solo albums

Studio albums

Live albums

Solo singles 
 "Eme" (2012)
 "Terriblemente Cruel" (2013)
 "Afuera En La Ciudad" (2014)
 "Mirada Perdida" (2014)
 "Sixteen" (featuring Carlos Tarque and Fito Cabrales) (2015)
 "Sincericidio" (2016)
 "La Lluvia en los Zapatos" (2016)
 "Breaking Bad" (2017)
 "La Llamada" (2017)
 "No Te Preocupes por Mi" (2018)
 "Nuclear" (2019)
 "Lobos" (2019)
 "En El Espacio" (2019)
 "Mi Pequeño Chernóbil" (2020)
 "La Estación Eterna" (2020)

Awards and nominations

Goya Awards

Latin Grammy Awards 

Note: Three albums by Leiva have been nominated for Best Recording Package with the art director of each receiving the nomination; Boa Morente was nominated for Nuclear in 2019 and Cuando Te Muerdes el Labio (Edición Cerámica) in 2022, while Emilio Morente was nominated for Madrid Nuclear in 2021.

Los40 Music Awards

MTV Europe Music Awards

Premios Odeón

References

Spanish songwriters
1980 births
Living people
Singers from Madrid
Spanish pop singers
Spanish rock singers
21st-century Spanish singers
21st-century Spanish male singers
Sony Music Spain artists
Latin music songwriters